Levee Blues is the second album from American band Potliquor released in 1972.

Work on Levee Blues began in February 1971 at Deep South Recording Studio, and even though it had been planned for release in May, the band did not complete recording until August 1971 with the album release coming in December.

Reception 
Chess/Janus announced that they would be promoting the new album for Christmas sales, and the company took out a full page ad in Billboard in December to promote five of its new albums, including Levee Blues.

A good review in Billboard foreshadowed a successful run by Levee Blues. Billboard reported airplay in Kalamazoo, Michigan; Chico, California; De Kalb, Illinois; Long Beach, California; and Bridgeport, Connecticut in the first two months of 1972, and the album hit the Billboard chart at #208 at the end of January. "Cheer", a cut from the album was released quickly because of the early airplay it had been getting from national disc jockeys and entered the Billboard Hot 100 at #98 on February 12, 1972. Five weeks later, a constant increase in sales lifted Levee Blues to #168 and "Cheer" to #65. This would be the high water mark for both the album and single. The album was reported as still getting airplay in Livonia, Michigan at the end of the year.

Track listing

Personnel 
 Jerry Amoroso – drums, percussion, vocals
 George Ratzlaff – piano, pipe organ, organ, guitar, vocals
 Guy Schaeffer – bass guitar on all tracks except as noted below, vocals
 Les Wallace – guitars, vocals
 Leon Medica – bass guitar on "Cheer" and "Beyond the River Jordan"
Quote from Leon Medica in regard to "Cheer": "George Ratzlaff wrote the song, played keyboards and was the lead vocalist on "Cheer", Jerry Amoroso (drums), Les Wallace (guitar), and I was a studio session played and played bass on that track.  Guy Schaefer was a really good live bassist, but had problems with his tone when recording in the studio."

Additional musicians

 Paul Harrison – 12-string guitar
 Bobby Thomas – percussion
 Glen Spreen – horn arrangements
 Horns – Lee Fortier
Art DeCesare – horns
Bud Brashier – horns
Lloyd Roach – horns
Pete Verbois – horns
Jimmy Miller – horns
Charles Pounds – horns
Cy Frost – string arrangements
Dino Constantinides – strings
Leslie Petrere – strings
Kenneth Klaus – strings
Clarence Render – strings
Thaddeus Brys – strings
John Babb – strings
 Studio Chicks (aka "The Blackeyed Peas") – background vocals

Production
 Jim Brown  – producer
 Cy Frost – production assistant, engineer
 Design and Graphics – Martin McCoy III – design and graphics
 B.A. – photography
 Neil Traylor – assistance with remote recording
 Mia Krinsky – album coordinator
Bob Scerbo – production supervisor
 Pipe organ courtesy of the Paramount Theater (Baton Rouge), Tom Mitchell, and Donald May

References

External links 

1972 albums
Potliquor albums
Janus Records albums